Arnold L. Zenker (born 1938) is a retired media broadcaster and public appearance counselor who gained brief stardom by sitting in for Walter Cronkite on the CBS Evening News in 1967.  Zenker studied at the University of Pennsylvania in Philadelphia, from which he received an undergraduate and a law degree.  In 1967 at the age of 28, he was asked to sit in for anchor Walter Cronkite to deliver the nightly news. Zenker, working as a manager of news programming at CBS at the time, was chosen because a strike by the American Federation of Television and Radio Artists left the network without an immediate substitute.

For 13 days, Zenker delivered the CBS Evening News, telling viewers that he was "sitting in for Walter Cronkite".  After the strike ended, Cronkite returned on April 11, 1967, and opened with the words, "Good evening.  This is Walter Cronkite, sitting in for Arnold Zenker.  It's good to be back."

Once the strike ended Zenker returned to his former post.  After that he went on to host a variety of television and radio shows in Boston and Baltimore and worked at one time in labor relations at ABC.  Zenker founded the company Arnold Zenker Associates in Boston, which trains "people to successfully master the public spotlight."

References

External links
"Portrait of the Artists". Time. (April 7, 1967). Retrieved September 4, 2006.

American television journalists
Living people
Year of birth uncertain
CBS News people
American male journalists
Journalists from New York City
1938 births